"Harness Your Hopes" is a song by American rock band Pavement. It was originally recorded for the band's fourth studio album Brighten The Corners, but was ultimately left off the final record by Stephen Malkmus. It later appeared on the CD version of the "Spit on a Stranger" EP in 1999, and on the 2008 expanded reissue of Brighten The Corners, the Nicene Creedence Edition.

In 2017, the song became Pavement's most streamed song on Spotify, surpassing their previous hit "Cut Your Hair", and also became viral on social media app TikTok in 2020. A music video for the song was also released in March 2022 in anticipation for the reissue of the Spit on a Stranger EP.

Background 
"Harness Your Hopes" was originally written by Stephen Malkmus. While Malkmus liked the song, he left the song off of the album "for no good reason", which was because he thought the song sounded wrong after the band spliced the song to shorten a waltz section that came after the song's chorus, which the band did not tell him about. He then decided to turn it into a B-side.

The song's second verse, "Show me a word that rhymes with pavement/And I won't kill your parents and roast them on a spit", is a joke description of the word "depravement", with Malkmus describing the line as "the kind of thing you write when you're feeling cocky and you think it's a b-side [sic]".

Belated success 
The song, having previously never been on the band's top five songs on Spotify, suddenly became Pavement's most streamed song on Spotify in 2017. While the exact causes of the song's popularity are unknown, it has been suggested it was due to a change in Spotify's algorithm. It also became viral on TikTok, in 2020, with people dancing to the song. "Harness Your Hopes" currently has over 93 million streams on Spotify as of March 2023.

Stephen Malkmus became aware of the success of "Harness Your Hopes" in 2020, when he heard the song playing around a bakery near his home in Portland, Oregon, and was informed by his kids that they knew the song. Scott Kanneberg cited the late success of "Harness Your Hopes" as "breath[ing] new life" into Pavement following their breakup, and Malkmus regretted his decision to leave it off the final album.

Music video 
A music video for the song, directed by Alex Ross Perry and starring Yellowjackets actor Sophie Thatcher was released on March 10, 2022, to promote the upcoming re-release of the Spit on a Stranger EP. The video, directly inspired by the 1992 Peter Hyams film Stay Tuned, pays homage to Pavement's old music videos with Thatcher moving through projections of the band's videos. Perry directly received access to the band's music videos from Matador, and used/edited various shots to allow Thatcher to be a part of the videos; however, this was difficult due to varying footage quality, and as the scenery and lighting had to be painstakingly replicated to pull off the idea.

References 

Pavement (band) songs
1996 songs
Songs written by Stephen Malkmus